Kobyla Wola  is a village in the administrative district of Gmina Górzno, within Garwolin County, Masovian Voivodeship, in east-central Poland.

The village has a population of 315.

References

Kobyla Wola